Nox may refer to:

Science and technology
 NOx, a generic term for the mono-nitrogen oxides:
 Nitric oxide (NO)
 Nitrogen dioxide  (NO2)
 Nox (unit) (nx), a unit of illuminance
 Nox (platform), a piece of the software-defined networking ecosystem
 NADPH oxidase, a membrane-bound enzyme complex

Entertainment
 Nox (Stargate), a race in the television series Stargate SG-1
 Nox (Marvel Comics), a fictional character appearing in the Marvel Comics universe, based loosely on Nyx of Greek mythology
 Nox (video game)
 Nox (band), a pop band from Hungary
 Nox, Noximilien, in the Wakfu cartoon series
 Nox, in the U.S. TV series Star-Crossed
 Nox, a fictional character in the series Incarnations of Immortality by Piers Anthony

Other uses
 Nox (goddess), the primordial goddess of the night in Greek and Roman mythology
 Nox, Shropshire, a hamlet in England
 Nox (wrestler), ring name for Welsh professional wrestler Steffanie Rhiannon Newell
 N.O.X., another term used for Night of Pan

See also
 Atrophaneura nox, the Malayan batwing butterfly
 Nox2, a subunit of NADPH oxidase
 Night (Latin: Nox)
 Knox (disambiguation)
 Knock (disambiguation)
 Nock (disambiguation)
 Nitrogen oxide (disambiguation)